Jasmine Mian (born December 31, 1989 in Guelph, Ontario) is a politician and former Olympic wrestler from Canada. She won the bronze medal at the 48 kg event during the 2014 Commonwealth Games, and placed twelfth at the 2016 Summer Olympics.

Mian qualified to represent her country at the 2016 Summer Olympics, by winning the Canadian Trials in late 2015.

In July 2016, she was officially named to Canada's 2016 Olympic team.

Mian moved to Calgary in 2012. She was elected to Calgary City Council for Ward 3 in the 2021 Calgary municipal election, succeeding Jyoti Gondek, who was elected mayor.

References

External links
Official website
Twitter account

1989 births
Living people
Sportspeople from Guelph
Canadian female sport wrestlers
Wrestlers at the 2014 Commonwealth Games
Commonwealth Games bronze medallists for Canada
Wrestlers at the 2016 Summer Olympics
Olympic wrestlers of Canada
Commonwealth Games medallists in wrestling
Sportspeople from Calgary
Canadian sportspeople of Pakistani descent
Canadian sportsperson-politicians
Calgary city councillors
Women in Alberta politics
Women municipal councillors in Canada
Medallists at the 2014 Commonwealth Games